Valeria Moriconi (née Abbruzzetti; November 15, 1931 – June 15, 2005) was an Italian actress who appeared both in movies and on stage.

Biography
Valeria was born in Iesi, in Marche, central Italy. Her earliest work was as a stage actress. She was very young when she acted in an art company, but success came with the movies Gli Italiani si voltano and La Spiaggia. She won the Golden Grolla award for Le soldatesse. She performed on stage in several plays at the Arlecchino Theater (now Flaiano), from Girotondo by Schnitzler and Per un amore a Roma by  Patti to Arialda by Testori and directed by Luchino Visconti.

In the 1960s she met director Franco Enriquez and left her husband, Aldo Moriconi, for him. After Enriquez's death she loved Vittorio Spiga, a journalist from Bologna, and at her death he was at her bedside.

The president of the Italian Republic, Oscar Luigi Scalfaro, nominated her Great Master of the Republic.

In 2000, she was the voice for the Pope's comments during the Via Crucis. In 1999, she received the Renato Simoni award. She worked until she died after suffering from bone cancer on June 15, 2005

Filmography

Non è mai troppo tardi (1953, of Filippo Walter Ratti) - Marta
Un turco napoletano (1953, of Mario Mattòli) - Una bagnante
L'amore in città (1953, of Alberto Lattuada) - (segment "Italiani si voltano, Gli")
 The Beach (1954, of Alberto Lattuada) - Gughi - l'esistenzialista
High School (1954, of Luciano Emmer) - Girl at the Dance Party (uncredited)
Miseria e nobiltà (1954, of Mario Mattòli) - Pupella
 Naples Is Always Naples (1954, of Armando Fizzarotti) - Doris
L'amante di Paride (1954, of Marc Allégret and Edgar G. Ulmer) - (Segment: The Face That Launched a Thousand Ships) (uncredited)
 The Boatman of Amalfi (1954, of Mino Roli) - Martina
I cavalieri dell'illusione (1954, of Marc Allégret)
L'eterna femmina (1954, of Marc Allégret)
The Best Part (1955, of Yves Allégret) - Odette - la serveuse de la cantine
Gli innamorati (1956, of Mauro Bolognini) - Marisa
Guardia, guardia scelta, brigadiere e maresciallo (1956, of Mauro Bolognini) - Maria Spaziani - Pietro's Daughter
Totò lascia o raddoppia? (1956, of Camillo Mastrocinque) - Elsa Marini
I giorni più belli (1956, of Mario Mattòli) - Silvana
Una voce una chitarra e un po' di luna (1956, of Giacomo Gentilomo) - Maria
I miliardari (1956, of Guido Malatesta)
Le belle dell'aria (1957, of Eduardo Manzanos Brochero)
I dritti (1957, of Mario Amendola) - Tosca
La rivolta dei gladiatori (1958, of Vittorio Cottafavi) - Serva (uncredited)
L'amore nasce a Roma (1958, of Mario Amendola) - Silvia
Las aeroguapas (1958, of Eduardo Manzanos Brochero)
I ragazzi dei Parioli (1959, of Sergio Corbucci) - Grazia
Le cameriere (1959, of Carlo Ludovico Bragaglia) - Gabriella Calcinetto
Lui, lei e il nonno (1959, of Anton Giulio Majano) - Tracy
Il terrore dell'Oklahoma (1959, of Mario Amendola) - Shirley
Un giorno da leoni (1961, of Nanni Loy) - Moglie di Orlando
A cavallo della tigre (1961, of Luigi Comencini) - Ileana Rossi
Ultimatum alla vita (1962, of Renato Polselli) - Anna
La costanza della ragione (1964, of Pasquale Festa Campanile) Giuditta
Le soldatesse (1965, of Valerio Zurlini) - Ebe Bartolini
Una macchia rosa (1970, of Enzo Muzii)
Il saprofita (1974, of Sergio Nasca) - Baroness Clotilde Bezzi
Calamo (1975, of Massimo Pirri) - Stefania
Per amore di Cesarina (1976, of Vittorio Sindoni) - Elvira Camporesi
Quelle strane occasioni (1976, of Nanni Loy) - Giobatta's wife (segment "Italian Superman")
Che notte quella notte! (1977, of Ghigo De Chiara) - Norma
Improvviso (1979, of Edith Bruck) - La zia Luisa
La fine è nota (1993, of Cristina Comencini) - Elvira Delogu
La forza del passato (2002, of Piergiorgio Gay) - Madre di Gianni (final film role)

Television
I grandi camaleonti (1964, of Edmo Fenoglio) - Godelieve
Resurrezione (1965, of Franco Enriquez) - Katiuscia
La locandiera (1966, TV Movie, of Franco Enriquez) - Mirandolina
Macbeth (1976, TV Movie, of Franco Enriquez) - Lady Macbeth
Alle origini della mafia (1976, of Enzo Muzii, Episode: "La speranza") - Isabella Mieli
Viaggio a Goldonia (1982, of Ugo Gregoretti)
Chéri (1988, TV Movie, of Enzo Muzii) - Lea

References

External links

Scheda del Dizionario dello Spettacolo del '900

interviste.intrage.it

1931 births
2005 deaths
People from Iesi
Italian film actresses
Italian stage actresses
Deaths from bone cancer
Deaths from cancer in Marche